Pakistan Air Force Act, 1953 is the primary statute governing the affairs of Pakistan Air Force.

History
The act was passed by the Parliament of Pakistan originally in 1953.

See also
Pakistan Army Act, 1952
Pakistan Navy Ordinance, 1961

References

Bibliography
 
 
 

Pakistan Air Force
Acts of the Parliament of Pakistan
1953 in Pakistan